Hoodlum & Son is a 2003 comedy-crime film.

Plot
In 1933, a mischievous ten-year-old, Archie (Myles Jeffrey), is left in the care of his unattentive father, Charlie (Ted King), a reluctant gangster indebted to mob boss Benny “The Bomb” Palladino (Robert Vaughn). Benny gives Charlie a last chance to clear his ‘debt’ by collecting money from a rival, but when Archie follows his father into a rival gangster's speakeasy, a series of bizarre events take place culminating in them fleeing without the money.

They head south to a dustbowl town where Charlie plans to repay his debt by stealing money from a bootlegging business run by Ugly Jim McCrae (Ron Perlman). However, Charlie realises things will not be that easy and is forced into taking a teaching job as cover which brings father and son closer.

When a beautiful widowed mother, Ellen Heaven (Mia Sara) takes offence at the new teacher, she does all she can to get him thrown out of town. Torn between their responsibilities and their attraction to each other, passions are awoken and Charlie and Ellen fall in love. However, the two revengeful mob bosses have not forgotten Charlie and arrive in town to settle scores.

Cast
 Mia Sara - Ellen Heaven
 Ted King - Charlie Ellroy
 Ron Perlman - 'Ugly' Jim McCrae
 Robert Vaughn - Benny 'The Bomb' Palladino
 Myles Jeffrey - Archie Ellroy
 Emily McArthur - Alabama Lubitsch
 Michael Richard - Sheriff Duggan
 Russel Savadier - 'Four Eyes' Morton
 Ian Roberts - Earl
 Karin van der Laag - Big 'Juicy' Lucy
 Anthony Bishop - Gillis Johnson
 Anthony Fridjohn - Police Chief 
 Charlotte Savage - Virginia Heaven
 Giles Hudson - Undertaker

References

External links
 
 
 

2003 films
2000s crime comedy films
British crime comedy films
2003 comedy films
2000s English-language films
2000s British films